Brett MacNeil (born November 27, 1967) is a former professional Canadian football offensive lineman who played twelve seasons in the Canadian Football League.

References 

Winnipeg Football Club Hall of Fame Biography.
Career Bio

1967 births
Living people
Boston University Terriers football players
Canadian football offensive linemen
Edmonton Elks players
Ottawa Rough Riders players
Players of Canadian football from Ontario
Canadian football people from Ottawa
Winnipeg Blue Bombers players